Yancy Medeiros Jr. (born September 7, 1987) is an American mixed martial artist who competes in the Lightweight division of Bellator MMA. A professional competitor since 2007, he has competed for the Ultimate Fighting Championship and Strikeforce.

Early life
Medeiros grew up in Wai'anae Hawaii and at a young age began training in Karate. He is of Filipino and Native Hawaiian descent, known as Hapa Pukiki and Hapa Pilipino. Medeiros wrestled for his Waianae High School wrestling team, placing third in the state wrestling tournament his senior season. Yancy credits Kawika Pa'aluhi, an early pioneer of MMA in Hawaii, with motivating him to train and pursue a career in MMA.

Mixed martial arts career

Early career
Medeiros began his career 4–0 before defeating EliteXC veteran Po'ai Suganuma at Destiny MMA: Pier Fighter 1. After winning two more fights to bring his record to 7–0, fighting as a Light Heavyweight, he then signed with Strikeforce.

Strikeforce
In his Strikeforce debut, moving down to Middleweight, Medeiros defeated Raul Castillo by unanimous decision at Strikeforce Challengers: Kaufman vs. Hashi.
No.
His next fight came against Gareth Joseph which Medeiros won via first-round KO due to punches at Strikeforce: Fedor vs. Werdum.

Medeiros was expected to face John Salter at Strikeforce Challengers: Woodley vs. Saffiedine.  However, Medeiros was forced from the bout with an injury.

Ultimate Fighting Championship
On January 31, 2013, it was announced that Medeiros would be brought over to the Ultimate Fighting Championship as part of the Strikeforce transition.

He dropped two weight classes to Lightweight and made his UFC debut against Rustam Khabilov on April 27, 2013 at UFC 159. The fight ended in unusual fashion as Medeiros dislocated his thumb during a takedown by Khabilov early in the first round, resulting in a TKO victory for Khabilov as Medeiros was unable to continue.

Medeiros took on Yves Edwards at UFC Fight For The Troops 3 on November 6, 2013. He won by KO in the first round. The win, however, was subsequently overturned when Medeiros tested positive for marijuana in his post-fight drug test.

Medeiros was expected to face promotional newcomer Joe Ellenberger on April 26, 2014 at UFC 172. However, in the week leading up to the event, Medeiros was pulled from the Ellenberger bout in favor of a match up on the main card with Jim Miller after his scheduled opponent Bobby Green pulled out of the bout. Medeiros lost the fight via submission in the first round.

Medeiros was expected to face Justin Edwards on August 30, 2014 at UFC 177.  However, Edwards pulled out of the event in the days leading up to the event citing an injury. Medeiros instead faced promotional newcomer Damon Jackson.  Medeiros won the fight by submission in the second round. The win also earned Medeiros his first Performance of the Night bonus award.

Medeiros faced Joe Proctor on December 12, 2014 at The Ultimate Fighter 20 Finale. Medeiros won the fight in the first round after dropping Proctor with a spinning back kick to the body and securing a guillotine choke to earn the submission.  The result also earned Medeiros a Performance of the Night bonus.

Medeiros was expected to face Tony Ferguson on February 28, 2015 at UFC 184.  However, Medeiros pulled out of the bout citing injury and was replaced by Gleison Tibau.

Medeiros faced Dustin Poirier on June 6, 2015 at UFC Fight Night 68. He lost the fight via TKO in the first round.

Medeiros faced John Makdessi on December 12, 2015 at UFC 194. He won the fight by split decision.

Medeiros next faced Francisco Trinaldo on May 14, 2016 at UFC 198. He lost the fight via unanimous decision. Both participants were awarded Fight of the Night honors.

Move up to welterweight
Medeiros faced Sean Spencer in a welterweight bout on September 10, 2016 at UFC 203. He won the fight via submission in the second round and was awarded a Performance of the Night bonus.

Medeiros was expected to face Li Jingliang on January 28, 2017 at UFC on Fox 23. However, in early January, Medeiros pulled out for undisclosed reasons and was replaced by promotional newcomer Bobby Nash.

Medeiros faced Erick Silva on June 3, 2017 at UFC 212. He won the fight via TKO in the second round.

Medeiros faced Alex Oliveira on December 2, 2017 at UFC 218. He won the back-and-forth fight via TKO in the third round. The win also earned him his second Fight of the Night bonus award.

Medeiros faced Donald Cerrone on February 18, 2018 at UFC Fight Night 126.  He lost the fight via technical knockout out in round one.

Medeiros was expected to face Mike Perry on July 7, 2018 at UFC 226. However, Medeiros pulled out of the fight on June 27 citing a rib injury and was replaced by Paul Felder.

Return to lightweight
Medeiros faced Gregor Gillespie in a lightweight bout on January 19, 2019 at UFC Fight Night 143. He lost the fight via TKO in the second round.

Medeiros faced Lando Vannata on February 15, 2020 at UFC Fight Night: Anderson vs. Błachowicz 2. He lost the fight via unanimous decision.

Replacing injured Nikolas Motta, Medeiros was scheduled to fight Damir Hadžović on May 22, 2021 at UFC Fight Night: Font vs. Garbrandt. However, the bout was pulled from the card just hours before taking place due to health issues with Hadžović. The pairing was rescheduled on June 26, 2021 at UFC Fight Night 190. He lost the fight via unanimous decision. Subsequently, he tested positive for marijuana and was suspended for four-and-a-half months by NSAC, making him eligible to return to competition on November 9, 2021.

In August 2021, Medeiros was released from UFC.

Bellator MMA 
Medeiros faced Emmanuel Sanchez on April 23, 2022 at Bellator 279. Medeiros won the bout via unanimous decision.

Medeiros is scheduled to face Charlie Leary on April 22, 2023 at Bellator 295.

Personal life
Medeiros started off his career fighting at light heavyweight. He then moved down to middleweight and eventually made his lightweight debut at UFC 159. Medeiros credits Nick Diaz and Nate Diaz for changing his diet and work ethic which allowed him to lose weight and move down in weight classes.

Championships and achievements
Ultimate Fighting Championship
Fight of the Night (Two times)  vs. Francisco Trinaldo and Alex Oliveira 
Performance of the Night (Three times) vs. Damon Jackson, Joe Proctor and Sean Spencer
 ESPN
 2017 Fight of the Year vs. Alex Oliveira

Mixed martial arts record

|-
|Win
|align=center|16–8 (1)
| Emmanuel Sanchez
|Decision (unanimous)
| Bellator 279
| 
| align=center|3
| align=center|5:00
| Honolulu, Hawaii, United States
| 
|-
|Loss
|align=center|15–8 (1)
|Damir Hadžović
|Decision (unanimous)
|UFC Fight Night: Gane vs. Volkov
|
|align=center|3
|align=center|5:00
|Las Vegas, Nevada, United States
|
|-
|Loss
|align=center|15–7 (1)
|Lando Vannata
|Decision (unanimous)
|UFC Fight Night: Anderson vs. Błachowicz 2 
|
|align=center|3
|align=center|5:00
|Rio Rancho, New Mexico, United States
|
|-
|Loss
|align=center|15–6 (1)
|Gregor Gillespie
|TKO (punches)
|UFC Fight Night: Cejudo vs. Dillashaw 
|
|align=center|2
|align=center|4:59
|Brooklyn, New York, United States
|
|-
|Loss
|align=center|15–5 (1)
|Donald Cerrone
|TKO (punches)
|UFC Fight Night: Cowboy vs. Medeiros 
|
|align=center|1
|align=center|4:58
|Austin, Texas, United States
|
|-
|Win
|align=center|15–4 (1)
|Alex Oliveira
|TKO (punches)
|UFC 218 
|
|align=center|3
|align=center|2:02
|Detroit, Michigan, United States
|
|-
|Win
|align=center|14–4 (1)
|Erick Silva
|TKO (punches)
|UFC 212
|
|align=center|2
|align=center|2:01
|Rio de Janeiro, Brazil
|
|-
|Win
|align=center|13–4 (1)
|Sean Spencer
|Submission (rear-naked choke)
|UFC 203
|
|align=center|2
|align=center|0:49
|Cleveland, Ohio, United States
|
|-
|Loss
|align=center|12–4 (1)
|Francisco Trinaldo
|Decision (unanimous)
|UFC 198
|
|align=center|3
|align=center|5:00
|Curitiba, Brazil
|
|-
|Win
|align=center|12–3 (1)
|John Makdessi
|Decision (split)
|UFC 194
|
|align=center|3
|align=center|5:00
|Las Vegas, Nevada, United States
|
|-
| Loss
| align=center| 11–3 (1)
| Dustin Poirier
| TKO (body kick and punches)
| UFC Fight Night: Boetsch vs. Henderson
| 
| align=center| 1
| align=center| 2:38
| New Orleans, Louisiana, United States
| 
|-
| Win
| align=center| 11–2 (1)
| Joe Proctor
| Submission (guillotine choke)
| The Ultimate Fighter: A Champion Will Be Crowned Finale
| 
| align=center| 1
| align=center| 4:37
| Las Vegas, Nevada, United States
| 
|-
| Win
| align=center| 10–2 (1)
| Damon Jackson
| Submission (reverse bulldog choke)
| UFC 177
| 
| align=center| 2
| align=center| 1:54
| Sacramento, California, United States
| 
|-
| Loss
| align=center| 9–2 (1)
| Jim Miller
| Technical Submission (guillotine choke)
| UFC 172
| 
| align=center| 1
| align=center| 3:18
| Baltimore, Maryland, United States
| 
|-
|  NC
| align=center| 9–1 (1)
| Yves Edwards
| No Contest (overturned)
| UFC: Fight for the Troops 3
| 
| align=center| 1
| align=center| 2:47
| Fort Campbell, Kentucky, United States
| 
|-
| Loss
| align=center| 9–1
| Rustam Khabilov
| TKO (thumb injury)
| UFC 159
| 
| align=center| 1
| align=center| 2:32 
| Newark, New Jersey, United States
| 
|-
| Win
| align=center| 9–0
| Gareth Joseph
| KO (punches)
| Strikeforce: Fedor vs. Werdum
| 
| align=center| 2
| align=center| 1:19
| San Jose, California, United States
| 
|-
| Win
| align=center| 8–0
| Raul Castillo
| Decision (unanimous)
| Strikeforce Challengers: Kaufman vs. Hashi
| 
| align=center| 3
| align=center| 5:00
| San Jose, California, United States
|
|-
| Win
| align=center| 7–0
| Zeke Prados
| TKO (punches)
| Destiny MMA: Maui No Kaoi
| 
| align=center| 1
| align=center| 2:23
| Wailuku, Hawaii, United States
| 
|-
| Win
| align=center| 6–0
| Jake Yasui
| Submission (rear-naked choke)
| UNU 1: Seek and Destroy
| 
| align=center| 1
| align=center| 1:46
| Wailuku, Hawaii, United States
| 
|-
| Win
| align=center| 5–0
| Po'ai Suganuma
| TKO (punches)
| Destiny MMA: Pier Fighter 1
| 
| align=center| 3
| align=center| 0:37
| Honolulu, Hawaii, United States
| 
|-
| Win
| align=center| 4–0
| Gino Venti
| Decision (unanimous)
| Hawaii Fight League 4
| 
| align=center| 3
| align=center| 3:00
| Waipahu, Hawaii, United States
| 
|-
| Win
| align=center| 3–0
| Larry Perreira
| KO (punches)
| Hawaii Fight League 3
| 
| align=center| 1
| align=center| 2:37
| Waipahu, Hawaii, United States
| 
|-
| Win
| align=center| 2–0
| Eddie Ohia
| TKO (punches)
| Hawaii Fight League 2
| 
| align=center| 1
| align=center| 1:23
| Honolulu, Hawaii, United States
| 
|-
| Win
| align=center| 1–0
| Rigo Mendoza
| KO (punches)
| Hawaii Fight League 1
| 
| align=center| 1
| align=center| N/A
| Honolulu, Hawaii, United States
|

See also
 List of current Bellator MMA fighters
 List of male mixed martial artists

References

External links
 
 

American male mixed martial artists
American people of Native Hawaiian descent
Living people
Lightweight mixed martial artists
Middleweight mixed martial artists
Mixed martial artists from Hawaii
Mixed martial artists utilizing karate
Mixed martial artists utilizing wrestling
People from Honolulu County, Hawaii
Doping cases in mixed martial arts
1987 births
American mixed martial artists of Filipino descent
Ultimate Fighting Championship male fighters
American male sport wrestlers
Amateur wrestlers